Kyaukse District is a district of the Mandalay Region in central Myanmar.

Townships
The district contains the following townships:

Kyaukse Township
Sintgaing Township
Myittha Township

Tada-U Township was promoted as Tada-U District in 2022.

References

Districts of Myanmar
Mandalay Region